Copelatus striatellus is a species of diving beetle. It is part of the subfamily Copelatinae in the family Dytiscidae. It was described by Boheman in 1848.

References

striatellus
Beetles described in 1848